born April 1963 in Gunma Prefecture, Japan, is a professor of Tohoku University and researcher of stainless steel. He is the author of some 67 patents concerning a metallic material and anti-corrosive technology, that have various characteristics including various types of stainless steel. 
Hideo Muto, who was chair of the Gunma University department of education, is his uncle.

Career
 Takasaki high school graduation in 1982.
 Tohoku University engineering department graduation in 1986.
 Tohoku University graduate school engineering postgraduate course (metallurgical engineering specialty) Master's course finish in 1988.
 Nippon Steel entrance in 1988.
 He belonged to steel research center, technical research part (since 1994, head boffin).
 Tohoku University graduate school engineering postgraduate course (metallurgical engineering specialty) Doctoral course finish in 1998.
 He assumed Tohoku University graduate school engineering postgraduate course practical professor in 2005.
 He assumed Tohoku University graduate school engineering postgraduate course professor in 2014.

Awards
 Progressive prize in 1997 from Japan Society of Corrosion Engineering.
 Technical development prize in 2004 from The Japan Institute of Metals and Materials.
 Commemoration prize of science (Nishiyama commemoration prize) in 2014 from The Iron and Steel Institute of Japan by "study of localized corrosion of steel material".

References

1963 births
Japanese metallurgists
Japanese scientists
Living people
Tohoku University alumni
Academic staff of Tohoku University